Season 1998–99 was the 115th football season in which Dumbarton competed at a Scottish national level, entering the Scottish Football League for the 93rd time, the Scottish Cup for the 104th time and the Scottish League Cup for the 52nd time.

Overview 
Following three successive seasons of failure, Dumbarton produced what would be a marginally better league performance. Indeed, up until the beginning of April it was still technically possible for Dumbarton to have gained promotion, but in the end ran out of games.  The season was improved by an end of season streak which saw 7 wins taken from the last 9 games, and eventually a 4th place was achieved.  The winning run coincided with Ian Wallace's replacement by Jimmy Brown as manager, this following a suspension and subsequent internal investigation.

In the national cup competitions, it was a return to first round exits. In the Scottish Cup, Dumbarton lost to Livingston after a creditable drawn match.

In the League Cup, there was a disappointing first round defeat to Alloa Athletic.

Note that due to the lack of sponsorship, the Scottish Challenge Cup was not played.

Locally, in the Stirlingshire Cup, Dumbarton managed a draw from two ties and thus failed to reach the final.

Results & fixtures

Scottish Third Division

Scottish League Cup

Tennent's Scottish Cup

Stirlingshire Cup

Pre-season Matches

League table

Player statistics

Squad 

|}

Transfers

Players in

Players out

Trivia
 The League match against Brechin City on 12 September marked Lee Sharp's 100th appearance for Dumbarton in all national competitions - the 112th Dumbarton player to reach this milestone.
 The League match against Cowdenbeath on 7 November marked Toby King's 100th appearance for Dumbarton in all national competitions - the 113th Dumbarton player to reach this milestone.

See also
 1998–99 in Scottish football

References

External links
Derek Barnes (Dumbarton Football Club Historical Archive)
Peter Dennison (Dumbarton Football Club Historical Archive)
Paul Finnegan (Dumbarton Football Club Historical Archive)
David Reid (Dumbarton Football Club Historical Archive)
Barry Wilkinson (Dumbarton Football Club Historical Archive)
Alan Brown (Dumbarton Football Club Historical Archive)
Keith Miller (Dumbarton Football Club Historical Archive)
Chris Smith (Dumbarton Football Club Historical Archive)
Scottish Football Historical Archive

Dumbarton F.C. seasons
Scottish football clubs 1998–99 season